Cupidesthes vidua is a butterfly in the family Lycaenidae. It is found in Angola and Zambia.

References

Butterflies described in 1929
Lycaenesthini